David Emil Reich (born July 14, 1974) is an American geneticist known for his research into the population genetics of ancient humans, including their migrations and the mixing of populations, discovered by analysis of genome-wide patterns of mutations. He is professor in the department of genetics at the Harvard Medical School, and an associate of the Broad Institute. Reich was highlighted as one of Nature's 10 for his contributions to science in 2015. He received the Dan David Prize in 2017, the NAS Award in Molecular Biology, the Wiley Prize, and the Darwin–Wallace Medal in 2019. In 2021 he was awarded the Massry Prize.

Early life
Reich grew up as part of a Jewish family in Washington, D.C. His parents are novelist Tova Reich (sister of Rabbi Avi Weiss) and Walter Reich, a professor at George Washington University, who served as the first director of the United States Holocaust Memorial Museum. David Reich started out as a sociology major as an undergraduate at Harvard College, but later turned his attention to physics and medicine. After graduation, he attended the University of Oxford, originally with the intent of preparing for medical school. He was awarded a PhD in zoology in 1999 for research supervised by David Goldstein. His thesis was titled "Genetic analysis of human evolutionary history with implications for gene mapping".

Academic career
Reich received a BA in physics from Harvard University and a PhD in zoology from St. Catherine's College in the University of Oxford. He joined Harvard Medical School in 2003. Reich is currently a geneticist and professor in the department of genetics at Harvard Medical School, and an associate of the Broad Institute, whose research studies compare the modern human genome with those of chimpanzees, Neanderthals, and Denisovans.

Reich's genetics research focuses primarily on finding complex genetic patterns that cause susceptibility to common diseases among large populations, rather than looking for specific genetic markers associated with relatively rare illnesses.

Genetic research

Split of chimpanzees and humans (2006)

Reich's research team at Harvard University has produced evidence that, over a span of at least four million years, various parts of the human genome diverged gradually from those of chimpanzees. The split between the human and chimpanzee lineages may have occurred millions of years later than fossilized bones suggest, and the break may not have been as clean as previously thought.  The genetic evidence developed by Reich's team suggests that after the two species initially separated, they may have continued interbreeding for several million years.
A final genetic split transpired between 6.3 million and 5.4 million years ago.

Indian population (2009)

Reich's 2009 paper Reconstructing Indian population history was a landmark study in the research on India's genepool and the origins of its population. Reich et al. (2009), in a collaborative effort between the Harvard Medical School and the Indian Centre for Cellular and Molecular Biology (CCMB), examined the entire genomes worth 560,000 single-nucleotide polymorphisms (SNPs), as compared to 420 SNPs in prior work.  They also cross-compared them with the genomes of other regions available in the global genome database. Through this study, they were able to discern two genetic groups in the majority of populations in India, which they called "Ancestral North Indians" (ANI) and "Ancestral South Indians" (ASI). They found that the ANI genes are close to those of Middle Easterners, Central Asians and Europeans whereas the ASI genes are dissimilar to all other known populations outside India. These two distinct groups, which had split ca. 50,000 years ago, formed the basis for the present population of India.

A follow-up study by Moorjani et al. (2013) revealed that the two groups mixed between 1,900 and 4,200 years ago (2200 BCE–100 CE), after which a shift to endogamy took place and admixture became rare. Speaking to Fountain Ink, David Reich stated, "Prior to 4,200 years ago, there were unmixed groups in India. Sometime between 1,900 to 4,200 years ago, profound, pervasive convulsive mixture occurred, affecting every Indo-European and Dravidian group in India without exception." Reich pointed out that their work does not show that a substantial migration occurred during this time.

, representing a collaboration between the Estonian Biocenter and CCMB, confirmed that the Indian populations are characterized by two major ancestry components. One of them is spread at comparable frequency and haplotype diversity in populations of South and West Asia and the Caucasus. The second component is more restricted to South Asia and accounts for more than 50% of the ancestry in Indian populations. Haplotype diversity associated with these South Asian ancestry components is significantly higher than that of the components dominating the West Eurasian ancestry palette.

Human genetic map (2011)
Reich was a co-leader, along with statistician Simon Myers, of a team of genetics researchers from Harvard University and the University of Oxford that made the most complete human genetic map then known in July 2011.

Interbreeding of Neanderthals and humans (2010–2012)

Reich's research team significantly contributed to the discovery that Neanderthals and Denisovans interbred with modern human populations as they dispersed from Africa into Eurasia 70,000–30,000 years ago.

Genetic markers for prostate cancer
Reich's lab received media attention following its discovery of a genetic marker which is linked to an increased likelihood of developing prostate cancer.  Reich has also argued that the higher incidence of prostate cancer among African Americans, compared to European Americans, appears to be largely genetic in origin.

Indo-European origins
Reich has suggested that the Indo-European languages may have originated south of the Caucausus, in present day Iran or Armenia: "Ancient DNA available from this time in Anatolia shows no evidence of steppe ancestry similar to that in the Yamnaya (although the evidence here is circumstantial as no ancient DNA from the Hittites themselves has yet been published). This suggests to me that the most likely location of the population that first spoke an Indo-European language was south of the Caucasus Mountains, perhaps in present-day Iran or Armenia, because ancient DNA from people who lived there matches what we would expect for a source population both for the Yamnaya and for ancient Anatolians. If this scenario is right the population sent one branch up into the steppe – mixing with steppe hunter-gatherers in a one-to-one ratio to become the Yamnaya as described earlier – and another to Anatolia to found the ancestors of people there who spoke languages such as Hittite."

Software tools
Reich has developed ADMIXTOOLS 2, an R software package primarily used for analyzing admixture, in collaboration with Nick Patterson.

Books
 Who We Are and How We Got Here, Oxford University Press, 2018

Notes

References

Sources

External links

 How Genetics Is Changing Our Understanding of ‘Race’ by David Reich
 "How Not To Talk About Race And Genetics" – a statement by 67 scholars criticizing Reich's treatment of "race" in his book Who We are and How We Got Here
 Harvard.edu – Dr. Reich's Lab
 David Reich, Who we are how we got there by Jared Diamond

1974 births
Alumni of St Catherine's College, Oxford
American geneticists
Archaeogeneticists
Living people
Genetic epidemiologists
Harvard College alumni
Harvard Medical School faculty
Howard Hughes Medical Investigators
Jewish American scientists
Paleogeneticists
21st-century American Jews